The 1980 municipal election was held October 15, 1980 to elect a mayor and twelve aldermen to sit on Edmonton City Council, nine trustees to sit on the public school board, and seven trustees to sit on the separate school board.

This was the first election in which there were two aldermen elected from each of the six wards, instead of three aldermen elected from each of the four wards, as had previously been the case.

Voter turnout

There were 72939 ballots cast out of 341102 eligible voters, for a voter turnout of 21.4%.

Results

(bold indicates elected, italics indicate incumbent)

Mayor

Aldermen
Guide:
E.V.A = Edmonton Voters Association
U.R.G.E. = Urban Reform Group Edmonton

Public school trustees

Separate (Catholic) school trustees

References

City of Edmonton: Edmonton Elections

1980
1980 elections in Canada
1980 in Alberta